Leslie Stephen Kuntar (born July 28, 1969) is an American former professional ice hockey player. He played in six NHL games with the Montreal Canadiens during the 1993–94 season. Prior to his professional career, Kuntar played for St. Lawrence University.

Kuntar has resided in Western New York since his retirement from professional hockey. He was one of the goaltenders to take part in the 2017 "11 Day Power Play", an attempt at the longest ice hockey game on record, and is an occasional member of the Buffalo Sabres Alumni Hockey Team.

Awards and honors

References

External links

1969 births
American men's ice hockey goaltenders
American people of Slovenian descent
Cleveland Lumberjacks players
Fort Wayne Komets players
Fredericton Canadiens players
Hershey Bears players
Living people
Montreal Canadiens draft picks
Montreal Canadiens players
Pensacola Ice Pilots players
People from Chemung County, New York
Rochester Americans players
St. Lawrence Saints men's ice hockey players
Utah Grizzlies (IHL) players
Worcester IceCats players
Ice hockey players from New York (state)
AHCA Division I men's ice hockey All-Americans